The Diictodontia were a group of herbivorous Dicynodonts from the Permian and Triassic of South Africa. 

The clade was named a sub group of the group Dicynodontia by Robert L. Carroll in 1988.

References

Dicynodonts
Guadalupian first appearances
Lopingian extinctions